Santo Tomás a town in Ensenada Municipality, Baja California, on the Pacific Coast of Mexico. Santo Tomás is a primarily a wine-growing region, though it is increasingly a tourist destination.

History

It was originally the site of the Misión Santo Tomás de Aquino.  After the mission was abandoned, it was taken as a post for the Mexican frontier garrison and for a time as the capital of the territory of Baja California.  The town grew up east of the Mission site.

Economy
Santo Tomás is a wine-growing region, home to numerous vineyards and wineries. Since the rise in popularity of Valle de Guadalupe as a premier wine region in Baja California, Santo Tomás has begun to develop tourist accommodations, such as hotels and fine dining.

See also
 Spanish missions in California

References

 Meigs, Peveril, III. 1935. The Dominican Mission Frontier of Lower California. University of California Publications in Geography No. 7. Berkeley.
 Vernon, Edward W. 2002. Las Misiones Antiguas: The Spanish Missions of Baja California, 1683-1855. Viejo Press, Santa Barbara, California.

Cities in Ensenada Municipality
History of Baja California